Stilbosis polygoni is a moth in the family Cosmopterigidae. It was described by Zeller in 1877. It is found in Colombia.

References

Natural History Museum Lepidoptera generic names catalog

Moths described in 1877
Chrysopeleiinae
Moths of South America